ION Orchard (pronounced as I-On), formerly known as the Orchard Turn Development or Orchard Turn Site, is a shopping mall in Singapore, next to Orchard MRT station. It is the retail component of an integrated retail and residential development by Orchard Turn Developments Pte Ltd, a joint venture between CapitaLand and Sun Hung Kai Properties. It started operating on 21 July 2009, occupying 335 food and retail outlets. In December 2016, Forbes recognized ION Orchard as one of the top shopping malls in Singapore.

The Orchard Residences, the residential component of the development, is a high-rise residential condominium. It was completed along with the shopping mall under the same developer, manager and owner in 2010. It owns a 99-year leasehold with effect from 13 March 2006.

History
The Orchard Turn Development, now known as The Orchard Residences and ION Orchard after its official names were revealed on 5 February 2007 and 16 July that year respectively, was built on the site of the former park located directly above Orchard. The MRT station's Exit C was closed and demolished on 15 January 2008 to make way for the ION Orchard development. A replacement for the exit, Exit E, was opened on the same day.

Designed by RSP Architects Planners & Engineers Ltd with Benoy, the Orchard Turn Development has won two EG Retail and Future Project Awards, the Best Architectural Entry and the Best Retail Development over 20,000 m², at Mapic 2006 held in Cannes, France, in November 2006.

Facilities
Layered across the walls of ION Orchard, the Media Facade is a multi-sensory canvas media wall.

A  art and exhibition gallery is located on the fourth floor of the shopping mall. Called ION Art, it aims to combine art and commerce. An art and design programme is implemented to introduce new and multimedia art into the mall experience, promoting the best of Asian modern and contemporary art and design from established and emerging artists and designers. Under this programme, permanent and changing sculptures and media installations will be located throughout the mall with art exhibitions held throughout the year within the ION Art Gallery and other locations in the mall.

The development's observation deck, ION Sky, is located on the 55th and 56th floor of the building. With a height of 218 m above ground, it offers a panoramic view of the city. It will also have a  garden on its 9th floor, together with two club facilities on its 9th and 30th floors.

The mall has two subway entrances on Level 1 connecting to ION Orchard via Orchard. The first entrance, Exit E (facing Wheelock Place), was opened on the morning of 15 January 2008, the same day when the station's Exit C (facing Wisma Atria) was closed and slated to be demolished and subsequently completed later that year. Mounted on Exit E's wall were more than 90 metres of LED walls, that can be programmed with different colours and patterns on its light displays to create a certain mood, even for festive occasions. It can also be used for advertising or as an art gallery from time to time.

The mall has a linkway leading from Orchard MRT Station to Tangs Plaza. The stretch had undergone a widening project which was completed in November 2014. Other shops include Redeye, Metaphor, Owndays, Yankee Candle, VDL Cosmetics, Lovisa, 7-Eleven and Selectiv' by Sasa. These new tenants join ION Orchard's existing collection of fashion favourites such as Victoria's Secret, H&M, and Mango at ION Paterson Link, located at Basement 2 of the mall.

The mall has a walkway leading from Orchard Boulevard to Orchard MRT station. Called the Orchard Boulevard Entrance, the first LED-lit subway entrance was opened on 10 June 2008 at the MRT station, with the help of the Land Transport Authority and SMRT Corporation on the planning of the walkway. Synchronized with ION Orchard's facade and canopy, the walkway has LED panels to create a surround experience for commuters, and a fritted glass-and-steel canopy roof to allow natural light to filter through. The walkway will also have easy access to the basement and ground levels of the mall from the subway station's concourse level as well as the walkway connecting the subway station to Wheelock Place.

The mall also has a car park with approximately 500 parking spots (including handicap parking), between the fourth and the eighth floors. Over 100 media screens located both inside and outside the shopping mall, including those above restroom urinals, are managed by JCDecaux.

Tenants
With a lettable area of almost 660 000 sq ft, around 400 retail outlets are currently located at ION Orchard. To date, there are various flagship stores, which include Rubi Shoes (which opened during 21 July 2009 and has since expanded island-wide), New Look, Li Ning, T.M. Lewin, Zara, Harry Winston, Dsquared2 and Bershka. On 12 November 2013, Rubi Shoes relocated to one store near Orchard MRT Station to replace Etude House. New Look was replaced by Zalora Flagship, and eventually Bershka. Bershka's old premise is now taken up by Sephora. On 16 June 2020, Topshop was permanently closed down, with the space being absorbed by expanded Uniqlo and the flagship Love Bonito. On 12 June 2022, Bershka officially closed down the ION Orchard outlet, and was replaced by a larger and flagship Cotton On outlet.

Four multi-label stores and several new-to-market food as well as dining propositions have also been confirmed, along with established food operators. There is a food court present at ION Orchard known as the Food Opera. There used to be a supermarket chain - ThreeSixty, but however it was shut down in May 2011 due to lack of business.

More than 21% of the lettable area has been used for dining purposes, with 60 out of the 125 dining outlets new-to-market or new concepts. There are 28 restaurants and cafes, with the largest cluster at level 4 for fine dining and levels 2 and 3 for casual dining. Dunkin' Donuts also returned to Singapore with an outlet in ION Orchard. A reputable top day spa Estheva Spa was another tenant to move into Ion Orchard.

Singapore Airlines’ City Ticketing Office moved to ION Orchard on 24 July 2009. This is a shift from its original location at The Paragon and the interim location at the Atrium@Orchard from 2007 to July 2009.

In January 2013, Crate & Barrel opened its first Asian store in ION Orchard. The  duplex store is located on levels 3 and 4.

In popular culture
The mall is featured in HBO series Westworld, as part of the third season.

Gallery

See also
 Orchard Road

References

External links

 
 The Orchard Residences website

CapitaLand
Shopping malls in Singapore
Downtown Core (Singapore)
Orchard Road
Commercial buildings completed in 2010
2009 establishments in Singapore